Bodaghabad (also Romanized as Bodāghābād) is a village in Dizicheh Rural District, in the Central District of Mobarakeh County, Isfahan Province, Iran. At the 2006 census, its population was 738, in 205 families.

References 

Populated places in Mobarakeh County